The 2005–06 season was PAOK Football Club's 80th in existence and the club's 47th consecutive season in the top flight of Greek football. The team will enter the Greek Football Cup in the Fourth round and will also enter in 2005–06 UEFA Cup  starting from the 1st Round.

Players

Squad

Transfers
Players transferred in

Players transferred out

Kit

Friendlies

Competitions

Overview

Managerial statistics

Alpha Ethniki

League table

Results summary

Results by round

Matches

Greek Cup

Fourth round

UEFA Cup

First round

PAOK advances to the UEFA Cup group stage.

Group stage

Statistics

Squad statistics

! colspan="13" style="background:#DCDCDC; text-align:center" | Goalkeepers
|-

! colspan="13" style="background:#DCDCDC; text-align:center" | Defenders
|-

! colspan="13" style="background:#DCDCDC; text-align:center" | Midfielders
|-

! colspan="13" style="background:#DCDCDC; text-align:center" | Forwards
|-

|}

Goalscorers

Source: Match reports in competitive matches, uefa.com, worldfootball.net

References

External links
 PAOK FC official website

PAOK FC seasons
PAOK